Jayam is a 1999 Tamil language horror film directed and produced by the duo Ravi-Raja, making their directorial debut. The film stars Sangita, Mansoor Ali Khan, Ishaq Hussaini and Vichithra, with Bhavana, Ragul, Rocky, Karikalan, Shanmugasundaram and Vadivukkarasi playing supporting roles. It was released on 15 October 1999.

Plot

The Tamil Nadu police are looking for professor Saamy, a mad scientist who committed multiple terrorist attacks in Tamil Nadu. The inspector of Police Rathnam, also an informer, informs each stage of the investigation to professor Saamy, thus Saamy managed to escape from the police each time. The commissioner of Police Sankar who handles the case, calls in Anand and Vijay to find and arrest Saamy. In the past, Anand and Vijay arrested Saamy but he was eventually released from jail thanks to his political influence. Saamy then kills Rathnam in his lab for an experiment, but the experiment went horribly wrong and Saamy dies on the spot.

The story shifts to a remote village where the villagers are mysteriously killed. Durga is a goddess believer and she is cherished by the villagers, she is the daughter of the village head Nattamai and Lakshmi. The rich landlord Mirasu hates Nattamai, and he wants to become the village head at any cost. In the meantime, Amudha, a journalist from Chennai, comes to write an article about the village and the religious beliefs, thereafter she becomes friend with Durga.

David and Mumtaj fall in love with each other, and only Durga knows about their love. Later, the young lovers are found dead in the forest by the villagers, and Mirasu blames Durga for killing them. Amudha stands by her side, she even promises to find the real culprit.

That night, Amudha is killed by a morbid creature in the forest. Anand and Vijay attempt to kill the creature but Vijay dies in the process and Anand ends up seriously wounded. To protect the village from the deadly creature, the villagers prepare a grand Puja. The creature then appears during the Puja and Durga destroys it with a trishula.

Cast

Sangita as Durga
Mansoor Ali Khan as Anand
Ishaq Hussaini as Vijay
Vichithra as Amudha
Bhavana as Mumtaj
Ragul as David
Rocky as Professor Samy
Karikalan as Mirasu
Shanmugasundaram as Nattamai
Vadivukkarasi as Lakshmi
K. K. Soundar as Rahim Bhai
Prathapachandran
Suryakanth as Inspector Rathnam
Raviraj as Commissioner Sankar
Loose Mohan as Kanakku
Thideer Kannaiah

Production
Ishaq Hussaini, brother of martial artist Shihan Hussaini, and a non-resident Indian based out of Poland, made his acting debut in the film.

Soundtrack

The film score and the soundtrack were composed by Pradeep Ravi. The soundtrack, released in 1999, features 5 tracks with lyrics written by Vairamuthu, Pulamaipithan, Bharathan and Pradeep Ravi.

References

1999 films
1990s Tamil-language films
Indian horror films
1999 directorial debut films
Fictional portrayals of the Tamil Nadu Police
1999 horror films